Eamon Morrissey (born 22 March 1966) is an Irish former hurler. At club level he played with O'Loughlin Gaels, St Martin's and O'Toole's and was also a member of the Kilkenny and Dublin senior hurling teams. He usually lined out as a forward.

Career

Morrissey first came to prominence at juvenile and underage levels with the St Martin's club while simultaneously lining out with the St Kieran's College team that lost the All-Ireland final in 1984. As a member of the St Martin's senior team he came on as a substitute for their All-Ireland Club Championship success in 1985. Morrissey first appeared on the inter-county scene with the Kilkenny minor team that lost the All-Ireland final to Limerick in 1984, before losing the All-Ireland under-21 final to Tipperary the following year. He was drafted onto the Kilkenny senior hurling team in 1989. Morrissey would go on to line out in three consecutive All-Ireland finals at senior level and, after defeat by Tipperary in 1991, claimed consecutive winners' medals against Cork in 1992 and Galway in 1993. He transferred to the O'Toole's club in Dublin in 1996 and won consecutive County Senior Championship titles before a three-year stint with the Dublin senior hurling team. Morrissey's other honours include two National League titles, three Leinster Championship medals and a Railway Cup medals with Leinster.

Honours

Team

St Kieran's College
Leinster Colleges Senior Hurling Championship: 1984

St Martin's
All-Ireland Senior Club Hurling Championship: 1985
Leinster Senior Club Hurling Championship: 1985
Kilkenny Senior Hurling Championship: 1984

O'Toole's
Dublin Senior Hurling Championship: 1996, 1997

Kilkenny
All-Ireland Senior Hurling Championship: 1992, 1993
Leinster Senior Hurling Championship: 1991, 1992, 1993
National Hurling League: 1989-90, 1994-95
Leinster Under-21 Hurling Championship: 1985
Leinster Minor Hurling Championship: 1984

Leinster
Railway Cup: 1988, 1993

Individual

Awards
All-Star Award: 1990

References

1966 births
Living people
St Martin's (Kilkenny) hurlers
O'Tooles hurlers
Kilkenny inter-county hurlers
Dublin inter-county hurlers
All-Ireland Senior Hurling Championship winners
Quantity surveyors